Connellia nahoumii is a plant species in the genus Connellia. This species is endemic to Venezuela.

References

nahoumii
Flora of Venezuela